Lionel Louis "Nils" Tremblay (July 26, 1922 – July 26, 1971) was a Canadian professional ice hockey forward who played 3 games in the National Hockey League for the Montreal Canadiens.

Career
Tremblay's career began in 1941, where he was signed by the Quebec Aces. In his only game with the Aces during the 1941–42 season, Tremblay was scoreless. Tremblay would remain with the Aces until the 1943–44 season. The following season, Tremblay was signed by the Montreal Canadiens on November 14, 1944. In his debut game with the Canadiens, Tremblay recorded his first and only point with the team (an assist.) Tremblay would later be recalled one more time with the Canadiens during the 1945–46 season but would be held scoreless over two games.

As a member of the Quebec Senior Hockey League, Tremblay was often a point per game player. He finished as high as second overall in the league scoring race during the 1948–49 season and his 71 assists led the league and earned him a place on the QSHL's Second All-Star Team. Upon the completion of his QSHL career in 1950, Tremblay totaled 361 points in 237 games (an average of 1.52 PPG.)

Death
Tremblay died on July 26, 1971, his 49th birthday.

Awards

QSHL
League leader, Assists (1949)
Second Team All-Star (1949)

Allan Cup
Champion (1944, 1949)

References

External links
 

1922 births
1971 deaths
Canadian ice hockey centres
Ice hockey people from Quebec
Montreal Canadiens players
Ottawa Senators (original) players
People from Capitale-Nationale
Quebec Aces (QSHL) players